Oak Grove Cemetery (originally the Sewall Burying Ground) is an historic cemetery located in Bath, Maine. Its oldest headstone bears the date January 22, 1777. The cemetery was purchased from the heirs of Charles Sewall in 1872.

The cemetery is situated on Oak Grove Avenue near Maple Grove Cemetery. These cemeteries are considered two of Bath's "big three", the other one being Calvary Cemetery, just north of downtown.

A portion of the cemetery close to Oak Grove Avenue is given to the Jewish Beth Israel Cemetery. It contains 96 burial spaces.

Whiskeag Trail traverses a portion of the cemetery, crossing Old Brunswick Road at its southern boundary. It crosses the cemetery's bridge that spans the Rockland Branch railroad.

Notable burials
 Emma Eames, opera singer and actress
 Peter A. Garland, United States Congressman
 Thomas W. Hyde, Union Army colonel and Medal of Honor recipient
 Arthur Sewall, politician and ship builder
 Harold Sewall, politician; son of Arthur
 Sumner Sewall, governor of Maine; grandson of Arthur

Gallery

References

External links
 Cemeteries & Parks – City of Bath official website
 Map of Oak Grove Cemetery – Granite In My Blood, August 29, 2011
 
 

Cemeteries in Sagadahoc County, Maine
Landmarks in Maine
Geography of Maine
Bath, Maine